Hugh Aitken is a Scottish curler.

Awards
: ,

Teams

Men's

Mixed

References

External links
 

Living people

Scottish male curlers
European curling champions
Scottish curling champions
Continental Cup of Curling participants
Year of birth missing (living people)